John William Merchant (May 3, 1899 – March 31, 1972) was an American athlete. He competed in the men's long jump at the 1920 Summer Olympics and the men's hammer throw at the 1924 Summer Olympics.

References

1899 births
1972 deaths
Athletes (track and field) at the 1920 Summer Olympics
Athletes (track and field) at the 1924 Summer Olympics
American male long jumpers
American male hammer throwers
Olympic track and field athletes of the United States
People from Coos Bay, Oregon